is a Japanese castle located in Ōno, Chita District, Aichi, former Owari Province. It is also known as Miyayama Castle (宮山城).

The area is since 1954 a part of the town of Tokoname in Aichi Prefecture.

External links 

 http://www.asahi-net.or.jp/~qb2t-nkns/owarioono.htm

Ono
Tokoname